Haplochromis cassius is a species of cichlid endemic to Lake Victoria where it may now be extinct.  This species grows to a length of  SL.

References

cassius
Fish described in 1978
Taxonomy articles created by Polbot